The 1999 Tour is a concert tour by British recording artist, Robbie Williams. The tour supported his second studio album, I've Been Expecting You and the compilation disc, The Ego Has Landed. Beginning in May 1999, the tour played over 40 shows in North America and Europe. The tour was launched to capitalise on the success of "Angels" in the United States and Canada. The tour also marks Williams's only concert performances in those territories.

Officially, the tour was known as Man, The Myth, The Tax Bill (a.k.a. Born To Be Mild), A Few Dollars More… and Get Your Coat Baby, You've Pulled!.

Setlist 
The following setlist was obtained from the concert held on 1 May 1999, at The Opera House in Toronto, Canada. It does not represent all concerts for the duration of the tour.
"Let Me Entertain You"
"My Name Is"
"Man Machine"
"Lazy Days"
"Hey Jude"
"Win Some Lose Some"
"Killing Me"
"No Regrets"
"Strong"
"Angels"
"Forever Texas"
"Karma Killer"
"Old Before I Die"
Encore
"Millennium"
"Song 2"
"Should I Stay or Should I Go"

Tour dates
Man, The Myth, The Tax Bill (a.k.a. Born To Be Mild)

Festivals

A Few Dollars More...

Get Your Coat Baby, You've Pulled!

Festivals and other miscellaneous performances
This concert was a part of the "Rock am Ring"
This concert was a part of "Rock im Park"
This concert was a part of the "Pinkpop Festival"
This concert was a part of the "Heineken Jammin' Festival"
This concert was a part of the "Roskilde Festival"
This concert was a part of "Rock Werchter"
This concert was a part of "Solidays"
This concert was a part of the "Slane Concert"

Personnel

Band 
 Gary Nuttall
 Chris Sharrock
 Claire Worrall
 Alex Dickson
 Fil Eisler

External links
 RobbieWilliams.com – Robbie Williams official website

References

Robbie Williams concert tours
1999 concert tours